The 2017 World Table Tennis Championships women's doubles was the 53rd edition of the women's doubles championship. Liu Shiwen and Zhu Yuling were the defending champions but decided not to play together this year.

Ding Ning and Liu defeated Chen Meng and Zhu 9–11, 11–8, 11–13, 11–8, 11–6, 6–11, 11–9 in the final.

Seeds
Matches were best of 5 games in qualification and best of 7 games in the 64-player sized main draw.

  Matilda Ekholm /  Georgina Póta (first round)
  Doo Hoi Kem /  Lee Ho Ching (quarterfinals)
  Chen Meng /  Zhu Yuling (final)
  Ding Ning /  Liu Shiwen (champions)
  Lee Zi-on /  Yang Ha-eun (first round)
  Chen Szu-yu /  Cheng I-ching (quarterfinals)
  Li Jie /  Li Qian (third round)
  Hina Hayata /  Mima Ito (semifinals)
  Polina Mikhailova /  Olga Vorobeva (first round)
  Petrissa Solja /  Sabine Winter (third round)
  Feng Tianwei /  Yu Mengyu (semifinals)
  Dóra Madarász /  Szandra Pergel (third round)
  Manika Batra /  Mouma Das (quarterfinals)
  Katarzyna Grzybowska /  Natalia Partyka (second round)
  Chantal Mantz /  Wan Yuan (second round)
  Nina Mittelham /  Kristin Silbereisen (second round)
  Ng Wing Nam /  Soo Wai Yam Minnie (third round)
  Yana Noskova /  Mariia Tailakova (second round)
  Yousra Abdel Razek /  Dina Meshref (second round)
  Alex Galič /  Rachel Moret (third round)
  Adriana Díaz /  Melanie Díaz (first round)
  Daniela Dodean /  Elizabeta Samara (second round)
  Katherine Low /  Paulina Vega (first round)
  Sarah De Nutte /  Ni Xialian (second round)
  Cheng Hsien-tzu /  Huang Yu-wen (second round)
  Hana Matelová /  Kateřina Tomanovska (second round)
  Miu Hirano /  Kasumi Ishikawa (third round)
  Kim Kyungah /  Suh Hyo-won (second round)
  Adina Diaconu /  Bernadette Szőcs (second round)
  Sarah Hanffou /  Olufunke Oshonaike (first round)
  Galia Dvorak /  María Xiao (second round)
  Tamolwan Khetkhuan /  Nanthana Komwong (second round)

Draw

Finals

Top half

Section 1

Section 2

Bottom half

Section 3

Section 4

References

External links
Main draw

Women's doubles
World